The participation of Maldives in the ABU TV Song Festival has occurred six times since the inaugural ABU TV Song Festival began in 2012. Since their début in 2014, the Maldivian entry has been organised by the national broadcaster Television Maldives (TVM). In 2019, Maldives withdrew from the festival, but then returned three years in 2022.

History
TVM made their début in the ABU TV Song Festivals at 2014 and they participated in the festival set in The Venetian Theatre, Macau, China

Participation overview

References 

Countries at the ABU Song Festival